United Nations Security Council Resolution 313, adopted on February 28, 1972, demanded that Israel immediately desist from ground and military action against Lebanon and withdraw all its military forces from Lebanese territory.

See also
 Israeli–Lebanese conflict
 List of United Nations Security Council Resolutions 301 to 400 (1971–1976)

References
Text of the Resolution at undocs.org

External links
 

 0313
 0313
Arab–Israeli peace process
1972 in Israel
1972 in Lebanon
 0313
February 1972 events